Bruce McLaren Intermediate is a school for children  11 to 12 years of age in Auckland, New Zealand.

History

During development, the school was known as Henderson South Intermediate. After the death of local race-car designer, driver, engineer and inventor Bruce McLaren in June 1970, the school was renamed Bruce McLaren Intermediate when it opened in 1971.

References

External links

Educational institutions established in 1971
Intermediate schools in Auckland
Henderson-Massey Local Board Area
Schools in West Auckland, New Zealand